Tajareh Rud (also Romanized as Tajareh Rūd; also known as Tajaroq) is a village in Tirchai Rural District, Kandovan District, Meyaneh County, East Azerbaijan Province, Iran. At the 2006 census, its population was 109, in 26 families.

References 

Populated places in Meyaneh County